The 1975 Polish Speedway season was the 1975 season of motorcycle speedway in Poland.

Individual

Polish Individual Speedway Championship
The 1975 Individual Speedway Polish Championship final was held on 28 September at Czestochowa.

Golden Helmet
The 1975 Golden Golden Helmet organised by the Polish Motor Union (PZM) was the 1975 event for the league's leading riders.

Calendar

Final classification
Note: Result from final score was subtracted with two the weakest events.

Pairs

Polish Pairs Speedway Championship
The 1975 Polish Pairs Speedway Championship was the 1975 edition of the Polish Pairs Speedway Championship. The final was held at Leszno on 27 September.

Junior Championship
 winner - Bolesław Proch

Silver Helmet
 winner - Bolesław Proch

Team

Team Speedway Polish Championship
The 1975 Team Speedway Polish Championship was the 1975 edition of the Team Polish Championship. 

Stal Gorzów Wielkopolski won the gold medal. The team included Edward Jancarz, Zenon Plech and Jerzy Rembas.

First League

Second League

References

Poland Individual
Poland Team
Speedway
1975 in Polish speedway